Anne Berest (born September 15, 1979) is a French writer and actress.

Biography 
In 2008 she adapted Patrick Modiano's short autobiography Un Pedigree for the theatre with Edouard Baer. , son of Françoise Sagan asked Berest to write about the creation of his mother's novel, Bonjour Tristesse. The resulting book, Sagan 1954, was well received by critics: Berest "searched for and found les mot justes."

In 2017, with her sister Claire Berest, she wrote a biography of her great-grandmother Gabrièle Buffet-Picabia. With Gabriële, the Berest sisters succeeded in bringing attention to their great-grandmother's often overlooked life and influence in the art world, specifically within the Dada movement. La carte postale (The postcard), an enquiry into her Jewish family's past during World War Two, made the final selection for the 2021 Prix Goncourt as well as the Prix Renaudot.

Books 
 La Fille de son père, éditions du Seuil, 2010,  
 Les Patriarches, éditions Grasset, 2012 
 Sagan 1954, éditions Stock, 2014, 
 How to be Parisian wherever you are (with Audrey Diwan, Caroline de Maigret and Anne Berest, Doubleday, 2014, 
 Recherche femme parfaite, éditions Grasset, 2015, 
 Gabriële (with Claire Berest), éditions Stock, 2017 
 La Visite, suivi de Les Filles de nos filles, Actes Sud, 2020, 
 La Carte postale, éditions Grasset, 2021

Screenwriter 
 Que d'Amour! (Just Love) by Marivaux, telefilm directed by Valérie Donzelli shown on Arte in 2014 - co-writer
 Paris Etc., series directed by Zabou Breitman shown on Canal+ in 2017 - co-writer
 Mytho, directed by Fabrice Gobert, released on Netflix in 2019 - co-writer (and co-creator)

References

External links 
 

Living people
21st-century French novelists
French screenwriters
1979 births